Kottappuram or Kottapuram is an urban village, situated at Paravur municipality in Kollam district, Kerala. It is one among the two villages in Paravur municipality and one among the 30 villages coming under Kollam Taluk.

Kottapuram is situated in between Paravur town and Paravur Thekkumbhagam. It is on the way towards Varkala.

Location
Paravur railway station - 400 m
Paravur Thekkumbhagam - 1 km
Pozhikara - 2.5 km
Nedungolam - 3.5 km
Kollam - 22.6 km

References

Neighbourhoods in Paravur
Villages in Kollam district